A turnover is a type of pastry made by placing a filling on a piece of dough, folding the dough over, sealing it, and then baking it. Turnovers can be sweet or savoury and are often made as a sort of portable meal or dessert.  They are often eaten for breakfast.

It is common for sweet turnovers to have a fruit filling and be made with a puff pastry  or shortcrust pastry dough and covered with icing; savoury turnovers generally contain meat and/or vegetables and can be made with any sort of dough, though a kneaded yeast dough seems to be the most common in Western cuisines. They are usually baked, but may be fried.

Savoury turnovers are often sold as convenience foods in supermarkets. Savoury turnovers with meat or poultry and identified as a turnover in the United States (for example, "Beef Turnover" or "Cheesy Chicken Turnover") have to meet a standard of identity or composition and should contain a certain amount of meat or poultry.

Names
A meat or vegetarian turnover may be called a "patty" in South Asian and Caribbean cuisine, e.g. a South Asian chicken patty, a Jamaican patty, a Haitian patty. It may be a "pasty" in Cornish cuisine. In Latin American cuisine savoury turnovers are called empanadas and can be baked or fried.

Fillings
Common turnover fillings include fruits such as apples, peaches and cherries, meats like chicken, beef and pork, vegetables such as  potatoes, broccoli and onions, and savoury ingredients like cheese. Specialty versions are also found, such as wild rabbit and leek.

In the United Kingdom turnovers are usually filled with cooked apples, but any fruit can be used, as described in Mrs Beeton's Book of Household Management.

Another type of turnover, a calzone, originated in Naples in the 18th century. Traditionally made from salted bread dough, baked in an oven and is stuffed with salami, ham or vegetables, mozzarella, ricotta and Parmesan or pecorino cheese, as well as an egg.

See also

 
 Blachindla
 Börek
 Bridie
 Calzone
 Curry beef turnover
 Curry puff
 Empanada
 Hot Pockets
 Jamaican patty
 Knish
 List of pastries
 List of stuffed dishes
 Panzerotti
 Pastel (food)
 Pasty
 Pot pie
 Samosa
 Stromboli
 Strudel
 Vietnamese Bánh patê sô

References

Desserts
Pastries
Pies
Stuffed dishes